Richland Township is one of the twelve townships of Allen County, Ohio, United States. The population at the 2010 census was 6,289.

Geography
Located in the northeastern corner of the county, it borders the following townships:
Riley Township, Putnam County - north
Union Township, Hancock County - northeast
Orange Township, Hancock County - east
Liberty Township, Hardin County - southeast corner
Jackson Township - south
Bath Township - southwest corner
Monroe Township - west
Pleasant Township, Putnam County - northwest

Two villages are located in Richland Township: Beaverdam in the southwest, and part of Bluffton in the northeast.

Name and history
It is one of twelve Richland Townships statewide.

Government
The township is governed by a three-member board of trustees, who are elected in November of odd-numbered years to a four-year term beginning on the following January 1. Two are elected in the year after the presidential election and one is elected in the year before it. There is also an elected township fiscal officer, who serves a four-year term beginning on April 1 of the year after the election, which is held in November of the year before the presidential election. Vacancies in the fiscal officership or on the board of trustees are filled by the remaining trustees. Public meetings are held the second and fourth Tuesdays of each month at 8pm unless otherwise posted per Ohio Revised Code Requirements for public notifications.

References

External links
Allen County website

Townships in Allen County, Ohio
Townships in Ohio